Gemini Peak is a summit in the Mosquito Range of the Rocky Mountains of North America. Gemini Peak is appropriately named considering the mountain has two distinct summits and that the Latin word Gemini means "twins." The northeast summit is slightly higher than its southwest "twin."

See also

List of Colorado mountain ranges
List of Colorado mountain summits
List of Colorado fourteeners
List of Colorado 4000 meter prominent summits
List of the most prominent summits of Colorado
List of Colorado county high points

References

External links

Gemini Peak CO, listsofjohn.com

Mountains of Colorado
Mountains of Lake County, Colorado
Mountains of Park County, Colorado
North American 4000 m summits